José Luis Abajo Gómez  nicknamed Pirri (born 22 June 1978) is a Spanish épée fencer.

Abajo won the silver medal in the épée team event at the 2006 World Fencing Championships after losing against France in the final. He accomplished this with his teammates Ignacio Canto, Juan Castañeda and Eduardo Sepulveda Puerto.

He won the bronze medal in the Épée competition at the 2008 Summer Olympics in Beijing, China, defeating Hungarian Gábor Boczkó.  Being this the first Olympic medal won by Spain in fencing, and becoming the Olympic medal number 100 (99 according to the IOC) in the history of Spain, regarding Winter and Summer Olympics.

In 2013 he was inducted in the Hall of Fame of the International Fencing Federation.

Record Against Selected Opponents
Includes results from all competitions 2006–present and athletes who have reached the quarterfinals at the World Championships or Olympic Games, plus those who have medaled in major team competitions.

  Joaquim Videira 3-1
  Ulrich Robeiri 0-1
  Gábor Boczkó 1-3
  Stefano Carozzo 2-0
  Maksym Khvorost 1-1
  Alfredo Rota 2-0
  Matteo Tagliariol 0-2
  Bas Verwijlen 1-1
  Diego Confalonieri 1-1
  Sven Järve 3-0
  Fabrice Jeannet 0-1
  Anton Avdeev 0-1
  Silvio Fernandez 1-0
  Guillermo Madrigal Sardinas 1-0
  Radosław Zawrotniak 0-1

Achievements
 2006 World Fencing Championships, team épée

References

1978 births
Living people
Spanish male épée fencers
Fencers at the 2008 Summer Olympics
Olympic fencers of Spain
Olympic bronze medalists for Spain
Medalists at the 2008 Summer Olympics
Mediterranean Games silver medalists for Spain
Mediterranean Games bronze medalists for Spain
Competitors at the 2001 Mediterranean Games
Competitors at the 2005 Mediterranean Games
Competitors at the 2013 Mediterranean Games
Mediterranean Games medalists in fencing
European Games competitors for Spain
Fencers at the 2015 European Games
Olympic medalists in fencing
21st-century Spanish people
20th-century Spanish people